PNS/M Hashmat (S-135) is the lead ship of  diesel-electric submarine based on the French Agosta-70-class design.

History

Construction and deployment
She was initially named SAS Astrant for the South African Navy and laid down on 15 September 1976, and launched on 14 December 1977 at Nantes in France.

See also 
 List of ships of Pakistan Navy

References

Bibliography 
 
 

Agosta-class submarines of the South African Navy
Hashmat-class submarines
Ships built in France
1977 ships
Submarines of Pakistan
Ships built by Chantiers Dubigeon